was a Japanese female professional Go player, and a disciple of Honinbo Shuei. She and Katsuko Ito (伊藤甲子) visited China in 1930, and were the first female Japanese Go players who visited China.

References

Japanese Go players
Female Go players
1872 births
1937 deaths